Steve Browning is an American former college baseball coach, currently serving as Athletic Director of the Southern Arkansas Muleriders. He was named to that position in the fall of 2012.

Pre-collegiate coaching
A native of Sheridan, Arkansas, Browning played two seasons at Crowder College in Neosho, Missouri before completing his eligibility at Southern Arkansas. Browning was a starter in the outfield during both his seasons at SAU and was a co-captain during his senior year. Browning hit .314 with 17 doubles, four home runs and 52 RBI in his two seasons for the Muleriders. Following his successful baseball playing career, Browning began his coaching career as a student assistant at SAU.

Collegiate coaching career
Browning spent ten seasons serving as a student assistant, graduate assistant, and assistant coach before being named head coach following the 2010 season. During his time at SAU, he has been a part of nine NCAA Regional teams and help guide the Muleriders to four regular season championships and six conference tournament titles. As the head coach, Browning has led all four of his teams to the conference tournament title with each receiving a bid to the NCAA Division II baseball tournament. Browning has had five players drafted into Major League Baseball. He has coached 18 first-team all-conference players, 16 second-team and honorable mention All-Conference players, nine All-Region players, three All-American selections, three Conference Freshmen of the Year, one Conference Pitcher of the Year, and one Conference Player of the Year.

Following the conclusion of the 2016 baseball season, SAU president Dr. Trey Berry announced that Browning would assume the full-time Athletic Director position.

Head coaching record

References

External links
Steve Browning Director of Athletics - Southern Arkansas University

Living people
Crowder Roughriders baseball players
Southern Arkansas Muleriders baseball coaches
Southern Arkansas Muleriders baseball players
People from Sheridan, Arkansas
Year of birth missing (living people)
Southern Arkansas Muleriders athletic directors